Seri Putra is a township in Bangi in Hulu Langat District, Selangor, Malaysia. This township is about 30 km from Kuala Lumpur and 18 km from Kuala Lumpur International Airport. The township is some 2.5 km from the Selangor–Negeri Sembilan border.

History
Developed by Bangi Heights Development Sdn Bhd, subsidiary of UM Land Bhd since 1997. Neighbouring townships are Bukit Mahkota, Taman Impian Putra, the new township of Bandar Puteri Bangi by IOI Properties Group Bhd and the Nilai Industrial Park on the neighbouring state of Negeri Sembilan.

Amenities
 Kolej Universiti Islam Antarabangsa Selangor (KUIS)
 Klinik Kesihatan Seri Putra
Petronas Petrol Station
Petron Petrol Station
 Bank Simpanan Nasional, Seri Putra Branch
 Night market, every Tuesday and Saturday
 Bangi police station
McDonald's
Tesco

Community

 Acacia
 Anjung Suasana
 Castanea
 D'Punchak Nusa
 D'Punchak Putra
 D'Punchak Unggul
 D'Punchak Aman
 D'Sentral
 Putra Terrace
 Laman Indah
 Legundi Residensi 
 Princeton Residences
 Putra Hill Residency
 PutraOne
 Putra Terrace
 Putra Tropika
 Putra Villa
 Rimbun Suria
 SeriPutra-5
 Vista Seri Putra
 Pangsapuri Seri Dahlia
 Pangsapuri Seri Mawar
 Pangsapuri Seri Melati
 Vesta View Bangi Apartment
 Taman Impian Putra

Mosque/Suraus
 Masjid Al-Azhar, KUIS
 Masjid Bandar Seri Putra, Bandar Seri Putra 
 Surau As Syakirin - Pangsapuri Seri Melati
 Surau Al-Hijrah - Putra Tropika
 Surau Khairiyatulislamiah Seri Dahlia - Pangsapuri Seri Dahlia
 Masjid Al-Mustaqim Bandar Seri Putra, Vista Seri Putra
 Surau Syaidina Umar Al-Khattab - Puncak Nusa

Commercial

Education

Pre-school
 An-Nur Ilmu Montessori
 Excel Edukid Centre
 Pasti Al-Faizin
 Q-dees
 CIC Where Leaders Are Born
 Tadika Al-Fatih
 Tadika Kemas
 Tadika Krista
 Taska BondaMama
 Taska Duniaku Ceria
 Tadika Seri Pelangi
 Taska Tunas Al-Fatih
 The Little Caliphs

Government funded school
 Sekolah Kebangsaan Bandar Seri Putra
 Sekolah Kebangsaan Bandar Bukit Mahkota
 Sekolah Rendah Agama Bandar Seri Putra
 Sekolah Menengah Kebangsaan Bandar Seri Putra
 Sekolah Menengah Kebangsaan Bandar Bukit Mahkota

College University
 Empire Putra College
 Selangor International Islamic University College (KUIS)

Access

Car
Besides the aforementioned exit to PLUS, the township is also served by the Semenyih–Banting Highway Federal Route 31.

Public transportation
Smart Selangor bus KJ02 to  KTM Bangi.

References

External links
Maps:
 Google Map
 Wikimapia
 Bandar Seri Putra Masterplan

Links:
 Portal Bandar Seri Putra
 Blog Bandar Seri Putra
 Community Forum of Bandar Seri Putra, Bandar Bukit Mahkota & Taman Impian Putra

Hulu Langat District
Townships in Selangor